Sir Robert Reeve, 2nd Baronet (29 June 1652 – 19 August 1688) was an English politician.

Reeve was the son of Sir George Reeve, 1st Baronet. In 1675, he was elected as a Member of Parliament for Eye. He was appointed to five parliamentary committees during the Cavalier Parliament. During the Exclusion Crisis, he voted consistently against excluding James, Duke of York from the throne. In October 1678 he succeeded to his father's baronetcy. Reeve lost his seat in 1679, but regained it in 1681. He left no trace on the records of the Oxford Parliament and did not stand for re-election in 1685. He died in 1688, at which point his title became extinct.

References

1652 births
1688 deaths
Baronets in the Baronetage of England
English MPs 1661–1679
English MPs 1681
Tory MPs (pre-1834)